Caroline Sidney Aaron (née Abady; born ) is an American actress.

She is known for her performances in films like Mike Nichols' Heartburn (1986) and Primary Colors (1998), as well as Woody Allen's Crimes and Misdemeanors (1989), Alice (1990), and Deconstructing Harry (1997), and Nora Ephron's Sleepless in Seattle (1993). She also appeared in Tim Burton's Edward Scissorhands (1990) and Stanley Tucci's Big Night (1996). More recently, she appeared in 21 Jump Street (2012) and its sequel 22 Jump Street (2014).

She is also known for her work on television, including guest roles on  Wings, Frasier, Curb Your Enthusiasm, Desperate Housewives, Transparent, Madam Secretary, and The Good Fight.

Her Broadway roles include Woody Allen's Relatively Speaking, I Hate Hamlet, Social Security and The Iceman Cometh starring Jason Robards.

She is currently a regular on the critically acclaimed and Primetime Emmy Award-winning show The Marvelous Mrs. Maisel (2017–present), with her comic performance of a Jewish mother winning her two consecutive Screen Actors Guild Awards for Outstanding Performance by an Ensemble in a Comedy Series alongside the rest of the series' cast.

Early life 
Aaron was born in Richmond, Virginia. Her mother, Nina Abady ( Friedman) was a civil rights activist; Alabama-born, she was of Syrian Jewish descent, and worked full time to support her three kids after Aaron's father, who was of Sephardic Jewish (Lebanese-Jewish) descent, died. Aaron's elder sister, Josephine Abady, a theatre director and producer, died from breast cancer on May 25, 2002, aged 52.

Aaron attended American University in Washington, D.C., studying performing arts. She studied acting at HB Studio in New York City.

Personal life
She has been married to James Foreman since 1980; they have two children.

Filmography

Film

Television

Aaron is a guest instructor at HB Studio.

Theatre

Additional Voice Acting

Award and nominations

References

External links

American film producers
American University alumni
Jewish American actresses
Actresses from Richmond, Virginia
1952 births
Living people
20th-century American actresses
21st-century American actresses
American film actresses
American stage actresses
American television actresses
Businesspeople from Richmond, Virginia
American women film producers
American people of Hungarian-Jewish descent
American people of Lebanese-Jewish descent
American Sephardic Jews
American Mizrahi Jews
21st-century American Jews